Dimlama or dymdama, is a Turkic and Uzbek (or-more broadly-Central Asian) stew made with various combinations of meat, potatoes, onions, vegetables, and sometimes fruits. Meat (lamb or sometimes veal or beef) and vegetables are cut into large pieces and placed in layers in a tightly sealed pot to simmer slowly in their own juices. Vegetables for dimlama may include, in addition to potatoes and onions, carrots, cabbage, eggplants, tomatoes, sweet peppers, spiced with garlic and a variety of herbs and condiments. Dimlama is usually cooked during spring and summer when there is a wide choice of vegetables. It is served on a large plate and eaten with a spoon.

See also

 List of stews
 List of Uzbek dishes

References
 Lynn Visson, The Art of Uzbek Cooking, Hippocrene Books, New York (1999).
 Recipe for dimlama on russian-cookbook.com 
 Recipe for dimlama with photo 
 Dimlama in Uzbek cuisine 
 Dimlama on CookEatShare

External links

Uzbek dishes
Kazakhstani cuisine
Kyrgyz cuisine
Tajik cuisine
Meat stews